Midway may refer to the following places in the U.S. state of Indiana:

Midway, Clinton County, Indiana
Midway, Elkhart County, Indiana
Midway, Franklin County, Indiana
Midway, Jefferson County, Indiana
Midway, Parke County, Indiana
Midway, Spencer County, Indiana